National Highway 766E, commonly referred to as NH 766E is a national highway in India. It is a secondary route of National Highway 66.  NH-766E runs in the state of Karnataka in India.

Route 
NH766E connects Kumta, Devimane, Ammenalli, Kolagibees, Hanumanthi, Sirsi, Yekkambi, Balihalli, Akki Alur, Aladakatti and Haveri in the state of Karnataka.

Junctions  
 
  Terminal near Kumta.
  Terminal near Haveri.

See also 
 List of National Highways in India
 List of National Highways in India by state

References

External links 

 NH 766E on OpenStreetMap

National highways in India
National Highways in Karnataka